Pesticide residue refers to the pesticides that may remain on or in food after they are applied to food crops. The maximum allowable levels of these residues in foods are often stipulated by regulatory bodies in many countries. Regulations such as pre-harvest intervals also often prevent harvest of crop or livestock products if recently treated in order to allow residue concentrations to decrease over time to safe levels before harvest. Exposure of the general population to these residues most commonly occurs through consumption of treated food sources, or being in close contact to areas treated with pesticides such as farms or lawns.

Many of these chemical residues, especially derivatives of chlorinated pesticides, exhibit bioaccumulation  which could build up to harmful levels in the body as well as in the environment. Persistent chemicals can be magnified through the food chain and have been detected in products ranging from meat, poultry, and fish, to vegetable oils, nuts, and various fruits and vegetables.

Definition

A pesticide is a substance or a mixture of substances used for killing  pests: organisms dangerous to cultivated plants or to animals. The term applies to various pesticides such as insecticide, fungicide, herbicide and nematocide. Applications of pesticides to crops and animals may leave residues in or on food when it is consumed, and those specified derivatives are considered to be of toxicological significance.

Background
From post-World War II era, chemical pesticides have become the most important form of pest control. There are two categories of pesticides, first-generation pesticides and second-generation pesticide. The first-generation pesticides, which were used prior to 1940, consisted of compounds such as arsenic, mercury, and lead. These were soon abandoned because they were highly toxic and ineffective. The second-generation pesticides were composed of synthetic organic compounds. The growth in these pesticides accelerated in late 1940s after Paul Müller discovered DDT in 1939. The effects of pesticides such as aldrin, dieldrin, endrin, chlordane, parathion, captan and 2,4-D were also found at this time. Those pesticides were widely used due to its effective pest control. However, in 1946, people started to resist to the widespread use of pesticides, especially DDT since it harms non-target plants and animals. People became aware of problems with residues and its potential health risks. In the 1960s, Rachel Carson wrote Silent Spring to illustrate a risk of DDT and how it is threatening biodiversity.

Regulations
Each country adopts their own agricultural policies and  Maximum Residue Limits (MRL) and Acceptable Daily Intake (ADI). The level of food additive usage varies by country because forms of agriculture are different in regions according to their geographical or climatical factors.

Pre-harvest intervals are also set to require a crop or livestock product not be harvested before a certain period after application in order to allow the pesticide residue to decrease below maximum residue limits or other tolerance levels. Likewise, restricted entry intervals are the amount of time to allow residue concentrations to decrease before a worker can reenter an area where pesticides have been applied without protective equipment.

International
Some countries use the International Maximum Residue Limits -Codex Alimentarius to define the residue limits; this was established by Food and Agriculture Organization of the United Nations (FAO) and World Health Organization (WHO) in 1963 to develop international food standards, guidelines  codes of practices, and recommendation for food safety. Currently the CODEX has 185 Member Countries and 1 member organization (EU).

The following is the list of maximum residue limits (MRLs) for spices adopted by the commission.

European Union 

In September 2008, the European Union issued new and revised Maximum Residue Limits (MRLs) for the roughly 1,100 pesticides ever used in the world. The revision was intended to simplify the previous system, under which certain pesticide residues were regulated by the Commission; others were regulated by Member States, and others were not regulated at all.

New Zealand

Food Standards Australia New Zealand develops the standards for levels of pesticide residues in foods through a consultation process. The New Zealand Food Safety Authority publishes the maximum limits of pesticide residues for foods produced in New Zealand.

United Kingdom 
Monitoring of pesticide residues in the UK began in the 1950s. From 1977 to 2000 the work was carried out by the Working Party on Pesticide Residues (WPPR), until in 2000 the work was taken over by the Pesticide Residue Committee (PRC). The PRC advise the government through the Pesticides Safety Directorate and the Food Standards Agency (FSA).

United States 
In the US, tolerances for the amount of pesticide residue that may remain on food are set by the EPA, and measures are taken to keep pesticide residues below the tolerances. The US EPA has a web page for the  allowable tolerances. In order to assess the risks associated with pesticides on human health, the EPA analyzed individual pesticide active ingredients as well as the common toxic effect that groups of pesticides have, called the cumulative risk assessment. Limits that the EPA sets on pesticides before approving them includes a determination of how often the pesticide should be used and how it should be used, in order to protect the public and the environment. In the US, the Food and Drug Administration (FDA) and USDA also routinely check food for the actual levels of pesticide residues.

A US organic food advocacy group, the Environmental Working Group, is known for creating a list of fruits and vegetables referred to as the Dirty Dozen; it lists produce with the highest number of distinct pesticide residues  or most samples with residue detected in USDA data. This list is generally considered misleading and lacks scientific credibility because it lists detections without accounting for the risk of the usually small amount of each residue with respect to consumer health. In 2016, over 99% of samples of US produce had no pesticide residue or had residue levels well below the EPA tolerance levels for each pesticide.

Japan 
In Japan,  pesticide residues are regulated by the Food Safety Act.

Pesticide tolerances are set by the Ministry of Health, Labour and Welfare through the Drug and Food Safety Committee. Unlisted residue amounts are restricted to 0.01ppm.

China 
In China, the Ministry of Health and the Ministry of Agriculture have jointly established mechanisms and working procedures relating to maximum residue limit standards, while updating them continuously, according to the food safety law and regulations issued by the State Council.  From GB25193-2010  to GB28260-2011, from Maximum Residue Limits for 12 Pesticides to 85 pesticides, they have improved the standards in response to Chinese national needs.

Health impacts 

Many pesticides achieve their intended use of killing pests by disrupting the nervous system. Due to similarities in brain biochemistry among many different organisms, there is much speculation that these chemicals can have a negative impact on humans as well. 
There are epidemiological studies that show positive correlations between exposure to pesticides through occupational hazard, which tends to be significantly higher than that ingested by the general population through food, and the occurrence of certain cancers. Although  most of the general population may not exposed to large portion of pesticides, many of the pesticide residues that are attached tend to be lipophilic and can bio-accumulate in the body.

According to the American Cancer Society there is no evidence that pesticide residues increase the risk of people getting cancer. Pesticide exposure cannot be studied in placebo controlled trials as this would be unethical. A definitive cause effect relationship therefore cannot be established. The ACA advises washing fruit and vegetables before eating to remove both pesticide residue and other undesirable contaminants.

Chinese incidents 
In China, a number of incidents have occurred where state limits were exceeded by large amounts or where the wrong pesticide was used. In August 1994, a serious incident of pesticide poisoning of sweet potato crops occurred in Shandong province, China. Because local farmers were not fully educated in the use of insecticides, they used the highly-toxic pesticide named parathion instead of trichlorphon. It resulted in over 300 cases of poisoning and 3 deaths. Also, there was a case where a large number of students were poisoned and 23 of them were hospitalized because of vegetables that contained excessive pesticide residues.

Child neurodevelopment 

Children are thought to be especially vulnerable to exposure to pesticide residues, especially if exposure occurs at critical windows of development. Infants and children consume higher amounts of food and water relative to their body-weight have higher surface area (i.e. skin surface) relative to their volume, and have a more permeable blood–brain barrier, and engage in behaviors like crawling and putting objects in their mouths, all of which can contribute to increased risks from exposure to pesticide residues through food or environmental routes. Neurotoxins and other chemicals that originate from pesticides pose the biggest threat to the developing human brain and nervous system. Presence of pesticide metabolites in urine samples have been implicated in disorders such as attention deficit hyperactivity disorder (ADHD), autism, behavioral and emotional problems, and delays in development. There is a lack of evidence of a direct cause-and-effect relationship between long-term, low-dose exposure to pesticide residues and neurological disease, partly because manufacturers are not always legally required to examine potential long-term threats.

See also
Child development
Dose–response relationship
Environmental effects of pesticides
Environmental issues with agriculture
Food safety
List of environmental issues
Pesticide poisoning
QuEChERS - method for testing pesticide residues

References

External links
The European Pesticide Residue Workshop
Pesticide residue in Europe
International Maximum Residue Level Database
UK Pesticides Safety Directorate
List of websites that specify pesticide residue limits
US EPA Pesticide Chemical Search
CODEX Alimentarius International Food Standards
Pesticides and Food:What the Pesticide Residue Limits are on Food

Pesticides
Soil contamination
Food safety
Food and the environment
Environmental impact of agriculture